Tiger Woods (born 1975) is an American professional golfer.

Tiger Woods or Tiger Wood may also refer to:

 Tiger Woods (book), 2018 biography of the golfer, by Jeff Benedict and Armen Keteyian
 Tigerwood, the common name for lumber produced from several species of tropical trees